The International Medal is an award presented by the Royal Academy of Engineering in the UK, to individuals who are non-UK citizens or residents. It is awarded to individuals who have made exceptional contributions to engineering.

Background
The medal is given annually to recognize individuals who have made sustained personal achievements in any field of engineering. Individuals are foreign nationals who are not citizens nor residents of the UK.

Winners
Source: RAE

2011 Andrew Viterbi  
2008 Abdul Kalam  
2007 Xu Kuangdi  
2006 Cham Tao Soon

See also

 List of engineering awards

References 

International awards
Awards established in 1991
Awards of the Royal Academy of Engineering